The Charles Juravinski Memorial Cup is a harness race for Standardbred pacers run annually at Flamboro Downs in Hamilton, Ontario, Canada. Set at a distance of one mile, it was first run in 1977 as the Confederation Cup Pace and through 2012 it was a race for three-year-olds. Placed on hiatus for 2013 and 2014, upon reinstatement in 2015, the Confederation Cup Pace was changed to an event for four-year-olds. The race was not contested in 2020 or 2021 due to the COVID-19 pandemic. In 2022, it was renamed the Charles Juravinski Memorial Cup in honour of Flamboro Downs' co-founder, Charles Juravinski, who passed away that year.

The Charles Juravinski Memorial Cup is the signature race of Flamboro Downs. Over the years it has attracted the some of the very best horses in North America including U. S. and Canadian Hall of Fame horses Abercrombie, Cam Fella, Jate Lobell, On The Road Again, and Somebeachsomewhere.

Historical race events
In 1985 Armbro Dallas finished first in the final but was disqualified making runnerup What's Next the winner. As a result, the race time was not recorded as official. Apaches Fame's win in 1990 marked the first time an Ontario sired, bred, and owned horse won the Confederation Cup.

In 2022, Linedrive Hanover broke the stakes, track, and Canadian record with a time of 1:49.

Records
 Most wins by a driver
 5 – Paul MacDonell (1995, 1997, 1998, 2004, 2008)

 Most wins by a trainer
 4 – William Wellwood (1991, 1996, 1997, 2002)

 Stakes record
 1:49 0/0 – Linedrive Hanover (2022)

Winners of the Confederation Cup Pace

† No official time recorded due to disqualification of 1st-place finisher, Armbro Dallas.

References

Recurring sporting events established in 1977
Harness racing in Canada
Horse races in Ontario
1977 establishments in Ontario
Sport in Hamilton, Ontario